Britannia Royal Naval College (BRNC), commonly known as Dartmouth, is the naval academy of the United Kingdom and the initial officer training establishment of the Royal Navy. It is located on a hill overlooking the port of Dartmouth, Devon, England. Royal Naval officer training has taken place in Dartmouth since 1863. The buildings of the current campus were completed in 1905. Earlier students lived in two wooden hulks moored in the River Dart. Since 1998, BRNC has been the sole centre for Royal Naval officer training.

History
The training of naval officers at Dartmouth dates from 1863, when the wooden hulk  was moved from Portland and moored in the River Dart to serve as a base. Prior to this, a Royal Naval Academy (later Royal Naval College) had operated for more than a century from 1733 to 1837 at Portsmouth, a major naval installation.

The foundation stone for a new building at the college was laid by King Edward VII in March 1902. Sir Aston Webb designed the shore-based college at Dartmouth, which was built by Higgs and Hill and practically completed in 1905.

From September 1903, officer cadets first entered the Royal Naval College, Osborne, then after two years transferred to Dartmouth, and the first such intake was in September 1905. 

The college was originally known as the Royal Naval College, Dartmouth (RNC). As a Royal Naval shore establishment, it was later known also by the ship name HMS Britannia (a battleship called  operated from 1904 to 1918). The college was renamed HMS Dartmouth in 1953, when the name Britannia was given to the newly launched royal yacht . As cadets at the college will be aware, there are 187 steps down from the college to Hindostan's mooring at Sandquay.

Cadets originally joined the Royal Naval College, Osborne, at the age of 13 for two years' study and work before joining Dartmouth. The Royal Naval College, Osborne closed in 1921.

During the Second World War, after six Focke-Wulf aircraft bombed the College in September 1942, students and staff moved activities to Eaton Hall in Cheshire until the autumn of 1946. Two bombs had penetrated the College's main block, causing damage to the quarterdeck and surrounding rooms.

Britannia Royal Naval College became the sole naval college in the United Kingdom following the closures of the Royal Naval Engineering College, Manadon, in 1994 and of the Royal Naval College, Greenwich, in 1998.

In 2020, a group of Junior Rates were trained at BRNC to help alleviate added pressure on HMS Raleigh, after a surge in recruitment. On 13 August 2020, a troop of 34 Ratings and 130 officers passed out simultaneously for the first time in the history of the Royal Navy. They were followed by a second class of Junior Rates who passed out on 17 December 2020.

Entry
Prospective cadets entrants must meet a minimum academic requirement. They then proceed to the Admiralty Interview Board, where they are tested mentally and physically. Several mental aptitude tests are administered, along with a basic physical fitness test and a medical examination. Officer cadets, as they are known until passing out from the college, can join between the ages of 18 and 39. While most cadets join BRNC after finishing university, some join directly from secondary school. The commissioning course is 30 weeks, with Warfare Officers and Aircrew spending a further 19 weeks studying academics at the college. A large contingent of international and Commonwealth students are part of the student body. The Royal Fleet Auxiliary sends its officer cadets to BRNC for a 10-week initial officer training course, before they start at a maritime college.

Royal cadets
King George V and King George VI were naval cadets at Dartmouth. The first "significant encounter" between Prince Philip of Greece and the then Princess Elizabeth took place at Dartmouth in July 1939, where Philip was a naval cadet. Charles III and the Duke of York also attended Dartmouth. The Prince of Wales spent a brief period at the College after leaving Sandhurst as part of his training with all three of Britain's Armed Forces.

Sheikh Mubarak Ali Yousuf Suoud Al-Sabah, a member of the Royal Family of Kuwait, attended the Royal Navy Young Officer Course at Britannia Royal Naval College in 2002. His Highness Sheikh Isa bin Salman bin Hamad Al Khalifa, the eldest son of the Crown Prince of Bahrain, also underwent training at BRNC (including time at sea in RN warships) from 2014 to 2015, prior to commencing active service in the Royal Bahrain Naval Force.

Commanders of the college
List below based on listing compiled by historian Colin Mackie;  additional references are given in the list.
Captain William E. Goodenough: May 1905 – August 1907
Captain Trevylyan D. W. Napier: August 1907 – July 1910
Captain Hugh Evan-Thomas: July 1910 – July 1912
Captain the Hon. Victor A. Stanley: July 1912 – ? 1914
Rear-Admiral Trevylyan D. W. Napier: September–December 1914
Captain Edmond Hyde Parker: ? 1914 – February 1915
Captain Norman C. Palmer: February 1915 – May 1916
Rear-Admiral William G. E. Ruck Keene: May 1916 – January 1919
Captain Eustace la T. Leatham: February 1919 – February 1921
Captain Francis A. Marten: February 1921 – January 1923
Captain the Hon. Herbert Meade: January 1923 – February 1926
Captain Martin E. Dunbar-Nasmith: February 1926 – February 1929
Captain Sidney J. Meyrick: February 1929 – December 1931
Captain Norman A. Wodehouse: December 1931 – December 1934
Captain Reginald V. Holt: December 1934 – December 1936
Captain Frederick H. G. Dalrymple-Hamilton: December 1936 – November 1939
Captain Robert L. B. Cunliffe: December 1939 – April 1942
Captain Edward A. Aylmer: April 1942 – December 1943
Captain Gerald H. Warner: December 1943–?
Captain Peveril B. R. W. William-Powlett: January 1946 – February 1948
Captain Hugh W. Faulkner: February 1948 – August 1949
Captain Norman V. Dickinson: August 1949 – April 1951
Captain Richard T. White: April 1951 – August 1953
Captain William G. Crawford: August 1953 – April 1956
Captain William J. Munn: April 1956 – August 1958
Captain Frank H. E. Hopkins: August 1958 – August 1960
Captain Horace R. Law: August 1960 – December 1961
Captain W. John Parker: December 1961 – September 1963
Captain John E. L. Martin: September 1963 – August 1966
Captain Ian W. Jamieson: August 1966 – April 1968
Captain David Williams: April 1968 – September 1970
Captain A. Gordon Tait: September 1970 – August 1972
Captain John M. Forbes: August 1972 – September 1974
Captain Michael A. Higgs: September 1974 – September 1976
Captain Paul W. Greening: September 1976 – October 1978
Captain Nicholas J. S. Hunt: October 1978 – June 1980
Captain J. Julian R. Oswald: June 1980 – June 1982
Captain Timothy M. Bevan: June 1982 – September 1984
Captain George M. Tullis: September 1984 – 1987
Captain John R. Brigstocke: 1987–89
Captain J. Robert Shiffner: 1989–91
Captain Richard G. Hastilow: 1991–93
Captain Simon Moore: 1993–95
Captain (later Commodore) Anthony P. Masterton-Smith: 1995 – January 1998
Commodore Roy A. G. Clare: January 1998 – 1999
Commodore Mark W. G. Kerr: 1999–2002
Commodore C. Anthony Johnstone-Burt: 2002–04
Commodore Richard J. Ibbotson: 2004–05
Commodore Timothy Harris: 2005 – April 2007
Commodore Martin B. Alabaster: April 2007 – September 2008
Commodore Jake K. Moores: September 2008 – March 2011
Commodore Simon P. Williams: March 2011 – September 2012
Captain Jerry Kyd: September 2012 – February 2014
Captain Henry Duffy: February 2014 – September 2016
Captain Jolyon Woodard: September 2016 – September 2019
Captain Roger Readwin: September 2019 – May 2022
Captain Sarah Oakley: May 2022 – Present

Images

Former students

See also
Royal Naval College, Greenwich
Royal Naval College, Osborne
Royal Naval Academy
The Royal Hospital School
King Fahd Naval Academy - Military naval college of Saudi Arabia, modelled on Britannia Royal Naval College.

References

Sources

External links

Official web site
The Dreadnought Project
The Britannia Association

Educational institutions established in 1863
Racquets venues
Education in Devon
Naval academies
Training establishments of the Royal Navy
Military academies of the United Kingdom
1863 establishments in the United Kingdom
Economy of Devon
Dartmouth, Devon
Military history of Dartmouth